The Wreckage of Stars is the debut full length record from American based progressive death metal band Black Crown Initiate. The album was released on September 30, 2014 through eOne Music and was produced by Carson Slovak (August Burns Red, Texas In July, Everclear). A music video was filmed for "Withering Waves" and "The Fractured One". The album debuted at #18 on the Billboard Heatseekers chart.

Track listing

References

2014 debut albums
Black Crown Initiate albums